A jacquemart (sometimes jaquemart and also called a quarter-jack) is an automaton, an animated, mechanised figure of a person, usually made from wood or metal, which strikes the hours on a bell with a hammer.  Jacquemarts are usually part of clocks or clocktowers, and are often near or at the top of the construction. The figurine is also known as Jack of the Clock or Jack o'Clock.
 
One of the oldest and best-known jacquemarts is found on the south tower of the cathedral  Church of Notre Dame of Dijon:  it was installed by  Philippe II of Burgundy in 1383. Other well-known historic jacquemarts are found on top of the Zytglogge tower in Bern, Switzerland and the Moors on the Torre dell'Orlogio di San Marco in Venice, Italy.

The word is originally French but is sometimes used in English as well.  The origin of the word is disputed, but one theory relates it to a tool called a 'jacke', used by the craftsmen building church towers, the steeplejacks.

Notable jaquemart figures
 Wimborne Minster Astronomical Clock, Dorset
 Norwich Cathedral astronomical clock, Norfolk
 The Potts of Leeds Ivanhoe Clock figures of 1878 by John Wormald Appleyard in Thornton's Arcade, Leeds, West Yorkshire, England.
 The coolie at Lau Pa Sat, Singapore

See also
 Automaton clock

References

Timekeeping components